Creamola Foam was a soft drink produced in the form of effervescent crystals that were mixed with water. It was manufactured in Glasgow and sold in the UK from the 1950s, until Nestlé ended production in October 1998.

In 2005, Allan McCandlish of Cardross started producing a re-creation of Creamola Foam under the name ‘Kramola Fizz’.

In April 2019, his daughter Agnes and son Andrew of McCandlish Farmhouse Confectionery relaunched the product under its original name of Creamola Foam (registered trademark) and is now available on the shelves again in Scotland as well as worldwide.

Details 

Creamola Foam came in the form of coloured crystals which were dissolved in cold water to form a sweet, fizzy drink. It was packaged in a small tin labelled with a cartoon girl and boy drinking with straws.

The drink originally came in raspberry, orange, and lemon flavours, and cola was later added.

The product was originally owned by Rowntrees before coming under the banner of Nestle UK until being sold off to Premier Foods.

The relaunched Creamola Foam drink comes in 17 flavours, including the original flavours which are Raspberry, Orange, Lemon, and Cola flavours.

Early form 
The original packaging consisted of a small tin with a tight metal lid, normally pried off with a teaspoon. A paper seal covered the foam crystals.

The packaging included the phrases:
 "CREAMOLA FOAM CRYSTALS"
 "MAKES 10 BIG DRINKS"
 "FULLY SWEETENED"

The original ingredient list read:
 Sugar
 Fruit acids
 Sodium bicarbonate
 Gum acacia, a thickener/stabiliser
 Saccharin
 Saponin, a foaming agent
 flavouring
 colour

Later revision 
The revision introduced in the 1980s featured a plastic lid and modernised branding. The label reads, "Creamola FOAM". The ingredients were:

 Sugar
 Citric acid
 Sodium bicarbonate
 Tartaric acid
 Flavoring
 Saccharin, sweetener
 Gum acacia, stabiliser
 Extract of quillaia, a foaming agent
 Carmine, food coloring agent (in this example, raspberry flavor)

The effervescence, when the powder dissolves as it is stirred into water, is due to the reaction of the citric and tartaric acids with sodium bicarbonate, forming carbon dioxide gas. These weak organic "fruit" acids also provide a sharp taste. The addition of stabiliser and saponaceous foaming agents extends the life of the bubbles. The artificial colouring and flavouring, plus the fruit acids, give the impression of a fruity base, although the recipe is essentially synthetic.

See also 
 Fizzies, a similar drink in the US.

References

External links 
 Picture of two Creamola foam promotional badges

Powdered drink mixes
Nestlé brands